Atiati is an islet in Penrhyn Atoll (Tongareva) in the Cook Islands. It marks the southwestern boundary of the atoll and is east of Mangarongaro.

References

Penrhyn atoll